Ducados is a brand of cigarettes that is currently owned and manufactured by Altadis, a division of Imperial Tobacco.  Ducados is Spanish for Ducats, a gold coin was part of the original design of the package.

History

The brand was introduced in 1963. The original Ducados cigarettes ("Ducados Negros") were strong and mainly smoked by men. As more women joined the workforce in and after the 1960s, the black cigarettes became less popular because many women didn't like the bad taste that it left in their mouths. Noticing this, Altadis released a Rubio ("Blonde") variant which was lighter.  The brand describes Ducados as having a well-built and rich flavor. In Spain, this brand is called "Tabaco negro" (Black tobacco) due to its supposed purity and the use of less chemical which make its color a lot darker than any other brands. Ducados cigarettes are made with 100% Canarian tobacco and it may be the only brand in Spain that uses white filter tips which makes Ducados a very distinguishable brand. Due to the popularity of the brand, Ducados cigarettes (along with other cheap brands) are often reserved by "tobacco tourists" from Great Britain and France while they go on holiday in Spain.

Markets
Ducados is mainly sold in Spain, but was or still is sold in Portugal, France, Germany and Austria.

Products
 Ducados Negro (Black)
 Ducados Rubio (Blonde)
 Ducados Rolling (Rolling tobacco)

See also

 Tobacco smoking

References

Altadis brands
Imperial Brands brands